Qeshlaq Rural District may refer to various places in Iran:
 Qeshlaq Rural District (Ahar County), East Azerbaijan Province
 Qeshlaq Rural District (Kaleybar County), East Azerbaijan Province
 Qeshlaq Rural District (Fars Province)

See also
 Qeshlaq-e Gharbi Rural District, Ardabil Province
 Qeshlaq-e Jonubi Rural District, Ardabil Province
 Qeshlaq-e Sharqi Rural District, Ardabil Province
 Qeshlaq-e Shomali Rural District, Ardabil Province